Day of the Destroyer is an adventure published by Hero Games and Iron Crown Enterprises (I.C.E.) in 1990 for the superhero role-playing game Champions.

Contents
In the first Champions adventure, The Island of Dr. Destroyer, the evil supervillain Dr. Destroyer tried to launch a mind-control satellite in order to rule the world. In this adventure, Dr. Destroyer is back with a Doomsday Device that will annihilate 90% of the world's population in 72 hours. The superheroes (player characters) must battle through a group of supervillains, treachery from within and a brainwashed puppet in order to stop Dr. Destroyer.

Publication history
In 1981, Hero Games published the superhero role-playing game (RPG) Champions and its the first adventure, The Island of Dr. Destroyer. Over the next five years, Hero Games published two more editions of Champions, but ran into financial difficulty, and was eventually taken over as a subsidiary of I.C.E. In 1989, Hero Games/I.C.E. published a fourth edition of Champions, and many adventures followed, including a sequel to The Island of Doctor Destroyer,  1990's Day of the Destroyer, a 32-page softcover book written by Scott Bennie, with interior art by Joe Phillips and cover art by Ben Dunn.

In the 2014 book Designers & Dragons, games historian Shannon Appelcline reviewed the entire cycle of Dr. Destroyer adventures, commenting "One of the final fifth edition Champions supplements, Book of the Destroyer (2008), brought the whole line full circle by providing in-depth details on the villain who started things off years earlier in The Island of Dr. Destroyer (1981) and its ICE sequel, Day of the Destroyer (1990). The new Hero's strong focus on a vibrant superhero setting would pay dividends a few years later."

Reviews
White Wolf #25 (Feb./March, 1991)

References

Champions (role-playing game) adventures
Role-playing game supplements introduced in 1990